KRUE (92.1 FM) is a radio station broadcasting a country music format. Licensed to serve Waseca, Minnesota, the station serves the Owatonna-Waseca area. The station is owned by Linder Radio Group.

External links
KRUE official website

Radio stations in Minnesota
Country radio stations in the United States